Sokol Krasnoyarsk is an ice hockey team in Krasnoyarsk, Russia. They play in the VHL, the second level of Russian ice hockey. The club was founded in 1977.

In 2012, Sokol signed Krasnoyarsk native NHL star Alexander Semin for the time of the NHL lockout. Semin decided to play for free as Sokol is his hometown team and the club he began his career with. However, after just four games with Sokol, Semin signed with Torpedo Nizhny Novgorod of the top-level Kontinental Hockey League.

Season-by-season VHL record

Note: GP = Games played, W = Wins, OTW = Overtime Wins, SOW = Penalty Shootout Wins, SOL = Penalty Shootout Losses, L = Losses, GF = Goals for, GA = Goals against, Pts = Points

 Records as of March 9, 2017

Notes and references

External links
 Official site

Ice hockey teams in Russia
Ice hockey clubs established in 1977
1977 establishments in the Soviet Union
Sport in Krasnoyarsk